Maris the Great is a promotional performance artist based in Denver, Colorado, and "undead" frontman for the punk rock band, Maris the Great and the Faggots of Death. He promotes bands through interviews on his website, MarisTheGreat.com. The interviews end with the fictional murder of the featured band and graphic photos of their demise.  Notable bands he has interviewed include Kittie, Comeback Kid, and Throwdown. Maris refers to himself as "Headbanger and Zombie Fag Extraordinaire," for his musical preferences and outspoken homosexuality. He is known for his refusal to break character or appear without makeup in public.

History
Maris the Great began working with Denver bands in 2000 to promote the local music scene.  His website went live at the stroke of midnight on June 1, 2000, and featured local pop-rock band, Rubber Planet, as its first victims.  Other local musicians followed, with the level of bloodiness escalating as Maris perfected the art of gore and as each band sought to out-do the last. In 2005, Maris expanded to the national scene by killing Massachusetts-based hardcore band, Bury Your Dead, and serving as their personal master of ceremonies on the Ozzfest tour.  During his two weeks at Ozzfest, many of the attendees began to refer to him as "The Ozzfest Monster," prompting MTV to include a segment on him in their coverage of the festival.  Fuse TV also ran a feature on the brain-eating zombie, as did Rue Morgue Magazine. Since he began his "killing spree" in 2000, Maris the Great has killed over 100 local and national acts.

Maris retired on July 30, 2011, having done all he set out to do. In July 2012, he emerged from retirement to begin a tradition of random appearances and occasional charity work during the summer months.  On Halloween of each year, he interviews and "kills" Denver's best band before returning to hibernation until the following July.

The Faggots of Death

In 2000, Maris and Dan Bray formed The Faggots of Death as the real life version of Maris' originally fictitious band. The name is a parody of metal groups with monikers such as Stormtroopers of Death and Method of Destruction. The band's first performance was at Denver's Sportsfield Roxx, where they were portrayed by members of Love .45. The band's current lineup consists of Dan Bray, Maris the Great, Chris Peterson, Michael California, and Ethan Zachary, who all (with the exception of Maris) perform under stage names such as Penis Colada and Faggety Ann. Their occasional live shows feature theatrics such as zombie attacks and sexually graphic stunts. Their MySpace page was removed from the site due to complaints about obscenity.

The Faggots of Death released their first studio recording in 2009, the EP Fuck You if You Don't Like Rock and Roll.

Controversy
In 2001, police escorted Maris from the Denver PrideFest gay pride parade when organizers of the event asked to have him removed. After pressure from Maris' supporters, the PrideFest organizers eventually issued an apology.

Westword's Laura Bond stated that, "The sexually explicit, pro-gay aspect of maristhegreat.com has proved a flash point." Others have dismissed Maris' homosexuality as just part of the act.  In an interview, Maris noted that his website "is not about sexuality; it's about challenging convention".  But he also stated, "I always felt like an outsider to the gay community anyway, because I was deeply into Metal, Punk and Hardcore. It's only recently that I'm meeting other gay people in extreme music. But initially, I was all alone. Even today, I'd much rather be at a Death Metal show than a gay bar."

Paul Koehler, drummer for the Canadian post-hardcore band Silverstein, had Maris the Great removed from Warped Tour due to his belief that death is not a laughing matter. Members of Terror and Sworn Enemy had to be calmed by Maris's manager before they would accept his presence.  And Groovey of Colorado Music Buzz Magazine called Maris "probably the most polarizing icon in music and entertainment there is."

The gore involved in Maris the Great's photo shoots have been a source of conflict and controversy in the past. After depicting the graphic death of KBPI's Matt Need online, police requested that Maris provide proof that the radio host was still alive. Emergency personnel have been summoned to photo shoots by members of the public who believed the blood was real, and police once blocked off an entire street after a faux severed penis was left on the sidewalk. Most of these incidents have ended amicably, with various authorities complementing Maris on the scenes' realism.

Videography

 Bite my Halloweenie, All Aspects Productions (2002) Running Time: 10 minutes
 Thrilled to Death, All Aspects Productions (2002) Running Time: 10 minutes
 I Wanna Wait music video with The Emmas, Downside Productions (2003) Running Time: 2:15 minutes
 Dead as Fuck: The Commodes Get Flushed, All Aspects Productions (2004) Running Time: 30 minutes
 Where the Fuck are They, Shock Brothers Studio (2007) Running Time: 9 minutes
 This is Family, Jean Baptiste Erreca (2008) Includes segment on Maris the Great.  Broadcast on Nuit Gay Americaine - Canal+, November 7, 2008 
 Awaken the Dreamers (Bonus DVD), All Shall Perish (2008) Features an appearance by Maris the Great 
 Diamonds Aren't Forever music video, Bring Me the Horizon (2008) Running Time: 3:58 minutes, brief appearance
 The Most Known Unknown DVD, The Acacia Strain (2010), appearance

Audio and visual media appearances

 Alive, Bury Your Dead (2005) Maris the Great murder photographs featured in CD packaging
 The Art of Partying, Municipal Waste (2007), appearance in CD artwork inner booklet
 A Plague of People, Jacknife (2008) includes the track "Maris the Great," written about the zombie
 "Maris the Bass," a custom bass guitar made by APC Instruments was displayed at the 2011 NAMM Show with a featured live appearance by Maris the Great
 Hails and Horns magazine, Maris' murder photographs showcased in every issue from the magazine's inception to his semi-retirement in 2011.
 Atom the Amazing Zombie Killer in 2011 Maris made a cameo in the Denver feature film by Bizjack Flemco Productions

Awards and honors
Westword — Best Web Site With Bite (2002)

References

External links 
 Official Website

American performance artists
Living people
American male singers
American punk rock singers
American gay musicians
Singers from Denver
Year of birth missing (living people)
20th-century American LGBT people
21st-century American LGBT people